Nur Kasih is a 2011 Malaysian romantic drama film serving as a continuation from the television drama series of the same name. The film was released to Malaysian cinemas on 19 May 2011.

Plot
The movie begins with a view of a Jordanian desert, where two Bedouin Arabs are walking by a lonely street. They were in for an unexpected shock as they witness a train colliding in a freak accident with a vehicle.

Story continues in the village where Nur Amina (Tiz Zaqyah) and Adam (Remy Ishak) reminiscing of past memories. Aidil's wife Aliya had died of an accident leaving two children, 7 year old Ilyas and 5 year old Mariam. Aidil (Fizz Fairuz) understandably becomes sad and depressed as a single parent raising two of his children alone. Ilyas, compared to the younger and more immature Mariam, understands more of the sadness and loneliness that his father suffered as the siblings grow together.

Soon enough Nur Amina becomes pregnant, much to Adam's joy after waiting for such a long time. Adam and Nur also happen to be involved in a shelter for troubled children as volunteers.

Finally, trials will come upon him again, Nur miscarriage and their son death. Adam feel very sad and almost lost faith in God because of that trials. Adam and Nur Amina was determined to go to Mecca for pleasure and closeness with God, they both want to continue education in Jordan. Aidil replace Adam and Nur task of guiding children in the shelter wildlife.

Adam and Nur was very happy there, but Adam was hit by a recurring dream about a bad luck to come. Adam had a dream that Nur died in her lap and he was very concerned if a tragedy occurs.

Cast

Main Cast
 Remy Ishak as Adam Hj. Hassan
 Tiz Zaqyah as Nur Amina Abu Bakar
 Fizz Fairuz as Aidil Hj. Hassan

Extended cast
 Liza Othman as Hajjah Khadijah
 Ayu Raudhah as Alia, Aidil's wife.
 Munif Isa as Mamat
 Sara Ali as Juriah, one of the residents for the shelter who has a crush on Adam.
 Syafie Naswip as Jamal, a friend of Juriah and also a resident of the shelter.
 Mia Sara Nasuha as Mariam, Aidil and Alia's daughter 
 Mohd Ilyas Suhaimi as Ilyas, Aidil and Alia's son

Cameo
 Rahim Razali as old Aidil
 Bonda Afida Es as old Amina
 Mazian Ahmad as old Adam
 Beto Kusyairy as Ustaz Wahid
 Zain Hamid as Saif
 Jehan Miskin as Iskandar
 Norman Hakim as old Ilyas
 Naeim Ghalili as the Jordanian officer

Reception

Critical response 
Entertainment portal Tupai gives the film an overall rating of 3 out of 5 The portal's review applauds its cinematography that attempts to imitate the feel of the series it was based on, and the acting by the three lead actors were lauded for successfully moving the audience. On the other hand, the film's plot was criticized for seemingly unable to find a resolution, making for a "scattered" pay-off. The review also pointed out on the difficulty of audiences following the story without watching the preceding TV series. The use of computer generated imagery in some scenes were commented to be not handled well and a distraction to the audience.

Soundtrack

Awards and nominations

References

External links
 Nur Kasih The Movie di Sinema Malaysia
 Filem 2011 di FINAS

Malay-language films
2011 films
2011 romantic drama films
Malaysian romantic drama films
Films based on television series
Grand Brilliance films
Films directed by Kabir Bhatia
Filmscape films
Films produced by Kabir Bhatia